The Salzburg S-Bahn is a large transport project in and around Salzburg in the Euroregion of Salzburg–Berchtesgadener Land–Traunstein, which crosses the border between Austria and Germany. Its S-Bahn network has been partially in operation since 2004 and its first stage was opened in 2014.

History

In 2009, Salzburg Hauptbahnhof was totally reconstructed. With the creation of additional through tracks for long-distance lines and the S-Bahn platform, the station's functionality was significantly improved. This will provide clearer pedestrian routes, full facilities for the disabled and improved services. It will also include the establishment of a wide passageway under the tracks, unifying some urban functions, and provide an improved access from the district of Schallmoos. The railway platforms will also be accessible from the nearby Nellböckviadukt.

Two urban stations, Salzburg Mülln-Altstadt and Salzburg Aiglhof, have been in operation since December 2009 and connect the S-Bahn and the urban public transport. Since that time, a third track has been added to the section from the Salzburg Hauptbahnhof to Salzburg Taxham Europark, which will allow an additional service on the western section, which will strengthen the railway for inner-city transportation.

In 2014, the line gained another urban station, Salzburg Liefering, and the western branch will have three continuous tracks to Freilassing. Afterwards, line S 2 will be extended to Freilassing, providing a 15-minute interval service between the Hauptbahnhof and Salzburg Freilassing station, which by then will be completely refurbished.

On the eastern branch with the Seekirchen Süd station is planned to provide better connectivity with central Seekirchen. In addition, the stations of Hallwang Elixhausen and Neumarkt Köstendorf are being modernised and upgraded as transport nodes.

Network

The railway network comprises five lines, which are operated by three operators: Salzburg AG, Austrian Federal Railways (ÖBB) and Berchtesgadener Land Bahn (BLB).

Currently, line S 2 ends at Salzburg Hauptbahnhof, as the western branch (Salzburg–Freilassing) and Salzburg Hauptbahnhof is not yet fully developed for the S-Bahn operation. To ensure that it has sufficient capacity for a 15-minute service, a third track is being built on the line between Salzburg Taxham Europark and Freilassing. As part of this work, which started in the spring of 2010, a new bridge is being built over the Saalach for the third track. A new railway bridge has already been built over the Salzach in the course of the building of a third track in central Salzburg from Salzburg Hauptbahnhof to Taxham.

The construction of the first station on the western branch (Salzburg Taxham Europark) began in the spring of 2005 and the station became operational in June 2006 and opened with the Europark, one of the largest shopping centres in Western Austria, and serves a school of the Missionaries of the Sacred Heart, the Red Bull Arena and a large number of households. Construction of the stations of Salzburg Mülln-Altstadt and Salzburg Aiglhof began in autumn of 2005 and they were opened on 12 December 2009. Thus the Paracelsus Private Medical University of Salzburg (PMU) and the Salzburg State Hospital will receive a connection to the new S-Bahn. Both stations are also stops on the Salzburg trolley bus network and the bus routes of Albus Salzburg Verkehrsbetrieb (the Salzburg municipal bus company) and some regional bus services.

Map

Operations

Fares

The entire S-Bahn Salzburg is integrated in the fare scheme of the Salzburg Transport Association (Salzburger Verkehrsverbund, SVV). In the city of Salzburg, the train can thus be used in the core zone with the same tickets as used for buses (a 24-hour ticket or a single ticket).

Clockface timetable

Trains on the lines S 1 and S 3 run on a basic 30-minute timetable (with additional services on line S 1 during the peaks to provide services every 15 minute). The S 2 and S 4 services will initially run every hour (with additional services during the peak hour) and line S 11, an outer branch of line S 1 will also operate hourly.

The timetable of line S 1 is not well timed for connections at Salzburg Hauptbahnhof to the other lines due to a noticeably divergent symmetry minute.

After the completion of the work, the services of S 2 and S 3 on the trunk route through the densely built-up urban area between Salzburg Hauptbahnhof and Freilassing will be timed to give a 15-minute interval schedule.

At the end points of S-Bahn lines S 2 and S 3 at present some trains continue to operate as Regionalbahn services.

Rolling stock

Lines S 2 and S 3 are operated by ÖBB with Bombardier Talent electric multiple units, consisting of 11 three carriage sets (ÖBB class 4023) and 10 four carriage sets (class 4024).

Salzburg AG operated lines S 1 and S 11 with 18 two carriage DC electric multiple units built by Simmering-Graz-Pauker or its successors.

Since December 2009, the BLB has operated line S 4 between Freilassing and Berchtesgaden, using five FLIRT railcars.

Future expansion
The S1 and S11 lines from Lamprechtshausen and Ostermiething to Salzburg Hauptbahnhof are planned to be extended to a new Mirabellplatz underground terminus station via a 750-metre tunnel, at a projected cost of €140 million. Construction for the extension may begin in 2023. A future extension to Salzburg South is estimated to cost €300 million.

References

External links

 
 

S-Bahn in Austria
Rail transport in Salzburg